Darie is a male given name and surname. Notable people with the surname include:

Darie Magheru (1923–1983), Romanian poet and theatre actor
Iurie Darie (1929–2012), Romanian actor
Vladimir Darie (born 1952), Moldovan historian, journalist, and politician
Alexandru Darie (1959–2019), Romanian director and manager of Bulandra Theater

Romanian masculine given names
Romanian-language surnames